William Fletcher Penn (January 16, 1871 in New Glasgow, Amherst County, Virginia – May 31, 1934) was a prominent black physician in Atlanta, Georgia and a founding member of the Atlanta Chapter of the National Association for the Advancement of Colored People (NAACP).

As a child Penn attended public schools in Lynchburg, Virginia and then Hampton Institute and Virginia Normal and Industrial School (Virginia State University). He first attended medical school at Leonard Medical School for Blacks (Shaw University) in Raleigh, North Carolina before being invited to attend Yale Medical School in 1893. He graduated in 1897, the first African-American to do so, as well as the first African-American to head the university yearbook.

In 1898 he met and later married Lula Tompkins, taking her son, Louis T. Wright, as his step-son. Penn had a significant influence on Wright, who also pursued a career in medicine, graduating fourth in his class at Harvard Medical School and serving as the first African-American surgeon on staff at the Harlem Hospital.

Penn was a founding member of the Atlanta chapter of the NAACP in 1917, a national organization for which his stepson Louis would later serve as chairman.

He is mentioned as a speaker at a meeting of city leaders in the aftermath of the Atlanta Race Riot in 1906, and in 1921 at the opening of Joyland, the first amusement park opened for blacks in Atlanta.

References

People from Atlanta
African-American physicians
Physicians from Georgia (U.S. state)
NAACP activists
1871 births
1934 deaths
Yale School of Medicine alumni
People from Virginia
American civil rights activists
20th-century African-American people